Maputo Special Reserve (formerly known as Maputo Elephant Reserve) is a nature reserve in Mozambique.

The reserve is located on Maputo Bay, approximately 100 kilometers southeast of the city of Maputo, Mozambique. The Reserve is 1,040 km2 (400 square mile) in extent and was originally proclaimed in 1932 to protect a small population of coastal elephants resident in the area.

The reserve combines lakes, wetlands, swamp forests, grasslands and mangrove forests with a coastline that lies within the Maputaland Centre of Endemism. According to the latest data, the number of elephants in the reserve is about 400.

The reserve will eventually form part of the Lubombo Transfrontier Conservation Area, which includes national parks from South Africa, Mozambique and Eswatini. Currently it forms part of the Usuthu-Tembe-Futi Transfrontier Conservation Area.

In 2018 the transfrontier conservation group Peace Parks Foundation signed a partnership agreement with the Mozambique government to support the management and development of the Maputo Special Reserve and adjacent Ponta do Ouro Partial Marine Reserve. This comprised US$16 million donated by a number of donors, including the Reinet Foundation, Wyss Foundation and World Bank funded MozBio programme.

Eco-tourism infrastructure in the reserve consists of the Anvil Bay resort, which opened in 2015.

Habitats

Fauna
Includes 350 African elephants, Birds (Kingfisher, Fish Eagle and many more), zebra, antelope, crocodiles, hippos, small bucks (red duiker, suni, reedbuck and steenbok).

References 

Protected areas of Mozambique
Elephant conservation
Geography of Maputo
Important Bird Areas of Mozambique